Rusty Saves a Life is a 1949 American drama film directed by Seymour Friedman and starring Ted Donaldson, Gloria Henry and Ann Doran.  It was part of the Rusty series of films produced by Columbia Pictures.

Cast
 Ted Donaldson as Danny Mitchell 
 Gloria Henry as Lyddy Hazard 
 Stephen Dunne as Fred Gibson 
 John Litel as Hugh Mitchell 
 Ann Doran as Ethel Mitchell 
 Thurston Hall as Counsellor Frank A. Gibson 
 Rudy Robles as Gono Sandoval 
 Flame as Rusty

References

Bibliography
 Blottner, Gene. Columbia Pictures Movie Series, 1926-1955: The Harry Cohn Years. McFarland, 2011.

External links
 

1949 films
1949 drama films
American drama films
Films directed by Seymour Friedman
Columbia Pictures films
American black-and-white films
Rusty (film series)
1940s English-language films
1940s American films